Tash, or TASH may refer to:

People
 Shortened form of Natasha
 Tash Aw (born 1971), Malaysian writer 
 Tash Sultana, Australian singer-songwriter and musician
 Tash (rapper), a solo artist and former member of rap group Tha Alkaholiks
 Tash (singer), British/Turkish Cypriot singer
 Tash (surname)
 A nickname for British photographer Alan Lodge

Places
 Täsch, a village in Valais, Switzerland
 Tash, Iran, a village in Gilan Province, Iran
 Tash-e Olya, a village in Semnan Province, Iran
 Tash-e Sofla, a village in Semnan Province, Iran
 Kiryas Tosh (aka Tash), Boisbriand, Quebec, Canada; a neighbourhood
 Yiddish name of Nyírtass, a Hungarian village

Other uses
 Tash (Narnia), an evil fictional deity in the Narnia stories
 TASH (organization), deals with disability issues
 TASH procedure, a.k.a. Alcohol septal ablation, a treatment of hypertrophic cardiomyopathy
 Tosh (Hasidic dynasty) aka Tash, a Jewish community

See also

 
 
 Taš (disambiguation)